John Breen may refer to:

 John Breen (actor), actor in the film Untraceable
 John Breen (Australian politician) (1898–1966), Australian politician
 John Breen (playwright), Irish playwright
 John Breen (RAF officer) (1896–1964), senior officer in the Royal Air Force
 John Breen (scholar) (born 1956), British Japanologist
 John W. Breen (1907–1984), American football coach and executive
 John Breen (sailor) (1827–1875), Irish soldier who fought in the American Civil War